The Independence Day Award, also termed Independence Award, Swadhinata Padak, and Swadhinata Puroskar, is the highest state award given by the government of Bangladesh. Introduced in 1977 by president Ziaur Rahman, this award is bestowed upon Bangladeshi citizens or organizations in recognition of substantial contribution to one of many fields, including the War of Liberation, the Language Movement, education, literature, journalism, public service, science and technology, medical science, social science, song, games and sports, fine arts, rural development, and other areas.

Each awardee receives a gold medal, a certificate of honour, and 500,000 Bangladeshi takas (US$5803). A cabinet committee on national awards prepares the list of each year's nominees and forwards the list to the head of the government for final approval. The award is traditionally presented on the eve of Independence Day in Bangladesh at a much publicized ceremony attended by several cabinet and parliament members and distinguished society guests.

In 2006, the award generated some controversy as the initial list was not accepted by the Prime Minister, some government ministers had expressed concern over the nomination of three fellow ministers. Furthermore, the award to the Rapid Action Battalion was criticized by many because of RAB's alleged involvement in extrajudicial killings.

Awards by decade
 List of Independence Day Award recipients (1977–1979)
 List of Independence Day Award recipients (1980–1989)
 List of Independence Day Award recipients (1990–1999)
 List of Independence Day Award recipients (2000–2009)
 List of Independence Day Award recipients (2010–2019)
 List of Independence Day Award recipients (2020–2029)

References

External links
 List of awardees, Cabinet Division, Bangladesh Government

Civil awards and decorations of Bangladesh
Awards established in 1977
1977 establishments in Bangladesh
Bangladeshi media awards